Maenan Abbey (formally: The Abbey Church of Saint Mary and All Saints; alternatively: Abaty Maenan, or Maynan Abbey; now Maenan Abbey Hotel) was a monastic religious house located in Maenan, Conwy, Wales.  It is situated near Llanrwst.

History
A Cistercian community was founded at Rhedynog Felen near Caernarfon in 1186 by a group of monks from Strata Florida Abbey. In 1190/91, they moved to Conwy, establishing Aberconwy Abbey, and in 1283, they transferred to Maenan after a forced move by order of Edward I, this abbey's founder, who had decided to build a castle on the site of the monks' former home at Aberconway. The Abbey was dedicated to Saint Mary and All Saints. The abbey at Maenan continued to exist until c.1538, when it was suppressed as part of Henry VIII's dissolution of the monasteries. At this point, the abbey's revenue was valued at £179 10s. 10d.

In 1563, the site of the abbey was given to Elizeus Wynne, who was also granted the township of Maenan itself. Wynne demolished many of the abbey's buildings, and used the materials to construct a new mansion on the site. Reused materials from the abbey were also incorporated in Gwydir Castle. The stone coffin of Prince Llewelyn the Great was moved from the abbey to the Gwydir Chapel at the church in Llanrwst. Only a small arch remains of the original edifice, which was described in Samuel Lewis' topographical dictionary as "remarkable for the pleasantness of its situation and the beauty of its architecture".

In 1885, the Cambrian Archaeological Association noted discrepancies regarding the subsequent history of the Maenan Abbey estate:

The grounds were excavated in 1963. In modern times, the site was developed into the Maenan Abbey Hotel. In 2011, three medieval walls were found in the grounds at Maenan Abbey Hotel while workmen were working on the drainage. They are believed to be the cloister walls, about 6 ft thick, dated to 1282. Cadw visited the site to assess the excavations.

References

External links
 Official website 

Llanddoged and Maenan
1530s disestablishments in Wales
Cistercian monasteries in Wales
Hotels in Conwy County Borough
Medieval Wales
Christian monasteries established in the 13th century
Monasteries dissolved under the English Reformation